Negoieşti may refer to several villages in Romania:

 Negoieşti, a village in Ştefan cel Mare Commune, Bacău County
 Negoieşti, a village in Melinești Commune, Dolj County
 Negoieşti, a village in Prigoria Commune, Gorj County
 Negoieşti, a village in Brazi Commune, Prahova County

See also 
 Negoeşti (disambiguation)